Delias ligata is a species of butterfly in the family Pieridae. It was first described by Walter Rothschild in 1904 and is endemic to New Guinea.

The wingspan is about 45–52 mm. Adults are similar to Delias kummeri, but may be distinguished by the red/black submarginal line on the underside of the hindwings which is continuous in this species, but broken in D. kummeri.

Subspecies
D. l. ligata (Central Highlands, Papua New Guinea)
D. l. weylandensis Joicey & Talbot, 1922 (Weyland Mountains, Irian Jaya)
D. l. dealbata Talbot, 1928 (Arfak Mountains, Irian Jaya)
D. l. interpolate Roepke, 1955 (Mount Sigi, Irian Jaya)

References

External links
Delias at Markku Savela's Lepidoptera and Some Other Life Forms

ligata
Butterflies described in 1904
Endemic fauna of New Guinea